Elaea or Elaia is an ancient harbor town on the African coast of the Red Sea or the Gulf of Aden.  The harbor is mentioned by Strabo (xvi. 8).

References
 Strabo xvi. 8
 Smith, William (editor); Dictionary of Greek and Roman Geography, "Stratonis Insula", London, (1854)

Ptolemaic colonies in the Red Sea